The 1974 San Jose State Spartans football team represented San Jose State University during the 1974 NCAA Division I football season as a member of the Pacific Coast Athletic Association. The team was led by second year head coach Darryl Rogers. They played home games at Spartan Stadium in San Jose, California. The Spartans finished the season with a record of eight wins, three losses and one tie (8–3–1, 2–2–0 PCAA).

Schedule

Team players in the NFL
The following were selected in the 1975 NFL Draft.

Notes

References

San Jose State
San Jose State Spartans football seasons
San Jose State Spartans football